The Republican Party of Albania (PR or PRSH ) is a national-conservative political party in Albania. It currently holds 3 of the 140 seats in the Parliament of Albania, in alliance with the Democratic Party of Albania.

History
The party was founded on 10 January 1991 under the leadership of the writer Sabri Godo, who was also its first Chairman. The party was formed with the backing of the Italian Republican Party. After the Democratic Party, it was the second party to be founded in Albania after the anti-communist revolution in the autumn of 1990. The Republicans chose the American Republican Party as their political role model. They arranged themselves as right of center on the political spectrum, slightly more right-wing than the Democratic Party of Albania.

In the 1992 elections the party received 2.9% of the national vote and won a single seat. They joined a coalition with the Democratic Party, but had little influence on the policies being shaped. The 1996 elections saw the party almost double its share of the vote to 5.9%, winning three seats. After the 1997 uprising, in which the centre-right coalition was overthrown by socialist supporters, the party became an opposition party. In the 1997 elections the party was reduced to a single seat.

Before the 2001 elections, the party joined the Union for Victory Coalition under the leadership of the Democratic Party, which won 46 seats. In the 2005 elections the party received 20% of the vote in the national voting for the proportional seats, putting it in first place. Although it won 11 proportional seats, it failed to win a single constituency seat, resulting in the party only being the third largest in Parliament. For the 2009 elections the party was part of the "Alliance for Changes" coalition. However, it was reduced to a single seat, after seeing its vote share fall to just 2.1% of the national total. In the 2011 local elections the party won a total of 67,039 votes throughout the country, twice the amount they had received in the 2009 Albanian parliamentary election.

Ideology
The Republican Party of Albania has adhered to the agenda of the American Republican Party and therefore its ideology is closely based on conservative, free market and many other right-wing policies. Although its policies are considered to be national conservative it also has several minor factions such as social conservatism and populism which have almost disappeared under the leadership of Fatmir Mediu, which has seen more right-wing policies such as national conservatism emerge, as well as several pro-EU and pro-NATO policies.

Though the party was founded as a conservative, Republican and generally anti-Communist and anti-Monarchist party, which wanted reforms to speed up so democracy could be put in place more quickly, and founded as an alternative to the Democratic Party and the Socialist Party, it has usually been aligned with the centre-right Democratic Party because it was bitterly opposed to the Socialists.

Election results

References

1991 establishments in Albania
Alliance of Conservatives and Reformists in Europe member parties
Conservative parties in Albania
National conservative parties
Political parties established in 1991
Political parties in Albania
Pro-European political parties in Albania

fi:Albanian sosialistinen puolue